Clothodidae is a family of webspinners in the order Embioptera. There are about 5 genera and 18 described species in Clothodidae.

Genera
These five genera belong to the family Clothodidae:
 Antipaluria Enderlein, 1912
 Chromatoclothoda Ross, 1987
 Clothoda Enderlein, 1909
 Cryptoclothoda Ross, 1987
 † Atmetoclothoda Engel & Huang, 2016

References

Further reading

 
 
 
 

Embioptera
Insect families